Frank Large (26 January 1940 – 8 August 2003) was an English footballer who played for many different clubs between 1958 and 1974 (he had three different spells at Northampton Town). On his retirement, he helped his son manage Westport United and Ballina Town, and played cricket for Co Mayo Cricket Club. His Son Paul Frank Large is The Co-Ordinator for Youth Reach in Ballina, County Mayo and the author of Have Boots Will Travel - The Story of Frank Large (Pitch Publishing, 2014).

External links
Frank Large career stats

1940 births
2003 deaths
Footballers from Leeds
English footballers
Queens Park Rangers F.C. players
Northampton Town F.C. players
Swindon Town F.C. players
Carlisle United F.C. players
Oldham Athletic A.F.C. players
Leicester City F.C. players
Fulham F.C. players
Chesterfield F.C. players
North American Soccer League (1968–1984) players
Baltimore Comets players
Halifax Town A.F.C. players
Association football forwards
English expatriate sportspeople in the United States
Expatriate soccer players in the United States
English expatriate footballers